The American Turf Stakes is a Grade II American Thoroughbred horse race for three-year-olds run over a distance of  miles on turf held annually in early May on the Kentucky Derby day meeting at Churchill Downs in Louisville, Kentucky during the spring meeting.

History

The event was inaugurated on 2 May 1992 as the fourth race on the undercard of the Kentucky Derby day meeting. The event was won by Senor Tomas who run as a Peter Vestal trained entry with Correntino in a time of 1:43.10.

The event was sponsored by Crown Royal from 1995 to 1998 and more recently by Ram Trucks from 2011 to 2019.

The event was classified as Grade III in 1998. The American Graded Stakes Committee upgraded the race to its current Grade II status in 2010.

The most notable winner of the event is the 2004 winner Kitten's Joy who as a three-year-old went on to finish second in the Breeders' Cup Turf to Better Talk Now and was voted as the U.S. Champion Male Turf Horse. His offspring have won this event three times: Banned (2011), Divisidero (2015) and Camelot Kitten (2016).

Records
Speed record:
 miles:  1:40.93 - Royal Strand (IRE) (1997)

Margins
 lengths - Banned (2001) 

Most wins by a jockey:
 3 - Mike E. Smith (1992, 1994, 2017)
 3 - Gary L. Stevens (1995, 1998, 2014)
 3 - Jerry D. Bailey (1999, 2000, 2004)
 3 - Garrett K. Gomez (2008, 2010, 2011)

Most wins by a trainer:
 3 - Dale L. Romans (2004, 2007, 2012)
 3 - Chad C. Brown (2013, 2016, 2019)

Most wins by an owner:
 2 - Thomas Carey (1992, 1994)
 2 - Kenneth and Sarah Ramsey (2008, 2011)
 2 - Glen Hill Farm (2011, 2014)

Winners

Notes:

§ Ran as an entry

† In the 1993 running Compadre was first past the post but hung in the straight causing interference to the second place finisher Desert Waves and was disqualified and placed second.

See also
 List of American and Canadian Graded races

External site
 2019 Churchill Downs Media Guide - $400,000 American Turf

References

Graded stakes races in the United States
Turf races in the United States
Flat horse races for three-year-olds
Churchill Downs horse races
Grade 2 stakes races in the United States
Horse races in Kentucky
Recurring sporting events established in 1992
1992 establishments in Kentucky